Phillips v Brooks Ltd [1919] 2 KB 243 is an English contract law case concerning mistake. It held that a person is deemed to contract with the person in front of them unless they can substantially prove that they instead intended to deal with someone else (see also Shogun Finance Ltd v Hudson).

Facts
On 15 April 1918, a man named North entered Phillips' jewellery shop and said, "I am Sir George Bullough". He wrote a dud cheque for £3000 to pay for some pearls and a ring. He said he lived in St. James's Square. Mr Phillips checked the phone directory and found there was someone there by that name. Mr Phillips asked if he would like to take the jewellery with him and Mr North said he would leave the pearls but take the ring 'for his wife's birthday tomorrow'. Mr North then pawned the ring to Brooks Ltd for £350. When the false cheque was dishonoured, Phillips sued Brooks Ltd to get the ring back.

Note that there are conflicting reports showing that Mr North identified himself after the ring was sold, as Viscount Haldane said in Lake v Simmons, but others say that North identified himself straight away.

Judgment
The earlier judgement of Cundy v Lindsay had established that contracts could be automatically void for mistake to identity. Where this is the case, title does not pass to the fraudulent buyer, and the third party loses out in the entirety. This principle is different where parties contract face to face; Horridge J stated:

This outcome can be explained by putting it as such: Mr Phillips hoped he was contracting with Sir George Bullough, but in reality he agreed to contract with whoever came into his shop, taking a risk that he was not who he said he was. It had the mere effect of making the contract voidable for fraud, meaning that title passed to the rogue and subsequently to the third party buyer:

See also

English contract law
Misrepresentation
Mistake in English contract law
Nemo dat quod non habet
 Cundy v Lindsay
 Shogun Finance Ltd v Hudson

References

English mistake case law
English misrepresentation case law
High Court of Justice cases
1919 in case law
1919 in British law